Toj or TOJ may refer to:ujhh
 ToJ, a German race car constructor
 Madrid–Torrejón Airport, IATA code: TOJ
 Open-jaw ticket

See also 
 Tøj & Sko, a Danish clothing store
 Luis Enrique Medrano Toj (born 1976), Guatemalan weightlifter